La Gaceta (Spanish for "The Gazette", full name La Gaceta de los Negocios, "The Business Gazette") is a newspaper belonging to the Intereconomia Group which is conservative and supportive of market liberalism.

History and profile
The newspaper was established as La Gaceta de los Negocios in March 1989. It was part of Grupo Zeta in the 1990s. In 1994 the paper had a circulation of 17,736 copies.

The paper once belonged to Grupo Negocios  until August 2009 when it was bought by Intereconomia Group. On 21 October 2009, the newspaper was relaunched nationally under the name La Gaceta. Following the transaction it also left its pure business focus, becoming a general newspaper. It sold out in its first day, selling 100,000 copies.

Its headquarters was in Madrid and it had branches in Barcelona, Bilbao, Valencia, and Valladolid. Conservative and economically liberal, La Gaceta positioned itself as the leading representative of Spanish conservatism and traditionalism.  It took strong stances against abortion and same-sex marriage and heavily criticized the Socialist government of 2004-2011.

In December 2013 the paper ceased paper publication, It continues to publish online.

See also
Spanish newspapers
Intereconomía TV

References

External links
 La Gaceta

1989 establishments in Spain
2013 disestablishments in Spain
Business newspapers
Conservatism in Spain
Daily newspapers published in Spain
Defunct newspapers published in Spain
Newspapers established in 1989
Newspapers published in Madrid
Online newspapers with defunct print editions
Publications disestablished in 2013
Spanish-language newspapers
Spanish-language websites
Spanish news websites